The Proletarian Society of China was a short-lived Trotskyist organisation founded in Hong Kong in 2002 out of a fuse of former members of the Japan Revolutionary Communist League, International Marxist Tendency and the Hong Kong Marxist Student Society who had established themselves under the name of the Proletarian Society of Chen Du-xiu. Sympathetic to the CRFI. Renamed in 2003.

Membership
Three branches were formulated at its height, Shenzhen, Tsuen Mun/New Territories and Hong Kong Island. Membership at its height of under 100 with 3 full-time organisers.

Formulated the Labour Party of Hong Kong in 2003, as a continuation of the demand for a 'Labour Congress of Migrant Workers' - President: 'Ka Yollie'; out of the Overseas Foreign Workers' movement of 2001-2. Had a membership in 2005 in excess of 1,200, encompassing Filipino, Indonesian, Chinese and westerners.(non Trotskyist), publishes the Hong Kong edition of Obrero - The Worker.

Publications
Proletarian Society published the journals, Proletarian (prior to the split) and The Trotskyist afterwards and had a small bookshop/print and organisational centre in Central District, Hong Kong Island - Proletarian Books. The bookshop and organisational centre being subject to a burglary in 2004 and destruction of property.

Proletarian Society split
Proletarian Society split in 2004 into the majority - Proletarian Society/Labour Party of Hong Kong, led by John Ho. This encompassed the students (who later split to join the USFI Pioneer Society but immediately left citing the 'Stalinist nature' of that organisation to reformulate the Marxist Student Society) and the Hong Kong Island branch.

The minority formulated around the Tsuen Mun/New Territories branch and was short-lived with the leading cadre, Takahashi Nobyuko being forced to return to Japan.

The Shenzhen branch was short lived given State attention in both China and the Hong Kong SAR.

Labour Party of the Philippines
The Proletarian Society went over en bloc to the Labour Party of the Philippines (PM) in 2005 and assisted in the work as an 'international' chapter of PM. The Labour Party still operates at present with an unknown membership and is based in Kowloon.

Basis of split
The basis of the split was over the formulation of a generalised workers' party and the role of the revolutionary party. Allegations were also raised by both sections of the split of embezzlement of funds.

2002 establishments in Hong Kong
2004 disestablishments in Hong Kong
Coordinating Committee for the Refoundation of the Fourth International
Defunct political parties in Hong Kong
Political parties disestablished in 2004
Political parties established in 2002
Trotskyism in China
Trotskyist organizations in Asia